The Bürglen (915 m) is the highest mountain of the Albis, a wooded range stretching west of Lake Zurich in the Swiss canton of Zurich. It is located between Hausen am Albis and the valley of the Sihl.

The mountain is entirely traversed by a trail running along the crest. South of the Bürglen is the slightly lower summit of the Albishorn (909 m), where there is a panoramic restaurant.

References

External links
Bürglen on Hikr

Mountains of the canton of Zürich
Mountains of Switzerland
Mountains of Switzerland under 1000 metres